Ki-tae, also spelled Ki-tai, is a Korean masculine given name. Its meaning differs based on the hanja used to write each syllable of the name. There are 68 hanja with the reading "ki" and 20 hanja with the reading "tae" on the South Korean government's official list of hanja which may be registered for use in given names.

People with this name include:
Kim Ki-tae (rower) (born 1952), North Korean rower
Bae Ki-tae  (born 1965), South Korean speed skater
Huh Ki-tae (born 1967), South Korean footballer
Kim Ki-tai (born 1969), South Korean baseball player

See also
List of Korean given names

References

Korean masculine given names